McBee  is a town in Chesterfield County, South Carolina, United States. As of the 2010 census, the population was 867.

History

Origin
McBee was named after a railroad executive, V.E. "Bunch" McBee, born July 26, 1849, in Greenville County, South Carolina. Bunch McBee was one of South Carolina's leading forces in the building of railroads, was responsible for the Columbia to Hamlet, North Carolina, line, which runs through McBee, and was at one time superintendent of the Seaboard Air Line Railroad.

20th century
In 1900, McBee's first railroad depot was built. About one year later on October 8, 1901, McBee was incorporated. On June 30, 1901, McBee Presbyterian Church was built, the first church in McBee. Six years later in 1907 McBee's second church, McBee Methodist Church, was built.

After the Seaboard's Columbia-to-Cheraw line was completed in 1900, McBee grew so quickly that a new depot became a high priority by the end of the decade. In 1914, the Seaboard Air Line Railroad built a second depot in McBee. This was both a passenger and freight depot until it closed in 1971. Now it is the McBee Depot Library and Railroad Museum. It was listed in the National Register of Historic Places in 1999 as the Seaboard Air Line Railway Depot in McBee. In 1980, the railroad became a subsidiary of the newly created CSX Corporation, and in 1986 the Seaboard name was changed to CSX Transportation.

In 1945, U.S. Route 1 through McBee was named the Blue Star Memorial Highway Number 6.

McBee Rescue was originally formed in 1962 as a joint venture with Jefferson Rescue to fill the need of rescue - ambulance service in the area. The ambulance was rotated between McBee and Jefferson and responded to the appropriate area as needed. The ambulance was originally parked on the street corner in McBee and later at the Health Center prior to constructing the current squad building. Prior to the ambulance, the only means of transport to the hospital was by personal vehicle or by the funeral home hearse, which had to come from Hartsville. Approximately one year later McBee and Jefferson split and formed their own respective squads and each purchased an ambulance.

In 1973, the town of McBee purchased a second engine for the McBee Fire Department. In 1986, Alligator Fire District was formed with McBee Fire Department.

21st century
In 2001, McBee celebrated its 100-year anniversary. In 2001 McBee Elementary School was re-modeled. Following the completion of the elementary school, in 2005 McBee High School also was re-modeled. In 2012 McBee built a recreational complex that consists of four baseball diamonds, a football field, a soccer field, a walking trail, and a practice football field. In 2013 McBee launched their official website. Nestle Waters of North American, completed their bottled water facility in 2016, creating 27 jobs in McBee.

Geography and climate
McBee is located in southwestern Chesterfield County at  (34.467803, −80.258075), in the Sandhills region of the Carolinas. U.S. Route 1 passes through the center of town, leading southwest  to Camden and northeast  to Cheraw. South Carolina Highway 151 crosses US 1 in the center of town, leading northwest  to Jefferson and southeast  to Hartsville.

McBee has a humid subtropical climate, characterized by humid summers and cool dry winters. Precipitation does not vary greatly between seasons. July is the hottest month, with an average high temperature of below 91 °F and an average low temperature of around 69 °F.[6] The coldest month of the year is January, when the average high temperature is near 54 °F and the average low temperature is below 32 °F.[6] The warmest temperature ever recorded in the town was 106 °F.[7] The coldest temperature ever recorded in the town was -2 °F.[8] While McBee is near a coastal area, hurricanes are not a major concern, but are possible in this part of South Carolina.

Demographics

2020 census

As of the 2020 United States census, there were 758 people, 365 households, and 275 families residing in the town.

2010 census
As of the census of 2010, there were 867 people, 282 households, and 195 families residing in the town. The population density was 613.3 people per square mile (237.7/km2). There were 329 housing units at an average density of 282.6 per square mile (109.5/km2). The racial makeup of the town was 53.36% White, 45.52% African American, 0.56% Native American, and 0.56% from two or more races. Hispanic or Latino of any race were 0.70% of the population.

There were 282 households, out of which 29.8% had children under the age of 18 living with them, 44.3% were married couples living together, 18.8% had a female householder with no husband present, and 30.5% were non-families. 27.3% of all households were made up of individuals, and 8.9% had someone living alone who was 65 years of age or older. The average household size was 2.53 and the average family size was 3.09.

In the town, the population was spread out, with 26.1% under the age of 18, 8.7% from 18 to 24, 26.1% from 25 to 44, 26.9% from 45 to 64, and 12.3% who were 65 years of age or older. The median age was 38 years. For every 100 females, there were 83.5 males. For every 100 females age 18 and over, there were 79.6 males.

The median income for a household in the town was $27,083, and the median  income for a family was $34,688. Males had a median income of $28,667 versus $21,500 for females. About 3.1% of families and 5.4% of the population were below the poverty line, including 33.2% of those under age 18 and 28.7% of those age 65 or over.

Education
McBee's public schools are under the jurisdiction of the Chesterfield County School District. The district operates McBee Elementary School and McBee High School.

McBee Elementary School is a public secondary school serving grades K through 6 in McBee. The school is located on McBee's West side, near Highway 1. McBee Elementary has an approximate enrollment of 401 and has 15.4 Student to Teacher Ratio, and is one of six elementary schools under the jurisdiction of Chesterfield County Public School District.

McBee High School is a public secondary school serving grades 7 through 12 in McBee. The school is located on McBee's west side, near the intersection of Highways 151 and 1. McBee High has an approximate enrollment of 600 students and is one of four high schools under the jurisdiction of Chesterfield County Public School District.

McBee has a public library, a branch of the Chesterfield County Library System.

Transportation

Highway
  South Carolina Highway 151 is a state highway that runs northwest to southeast through the town. McBee is approximately the halfway point between Charlotte and Myrtle Beach.
  U.S. Route 1 runs southwest to northeast through the town. The road runs from Fort Kent, Maine, to Key West, Florida. In 1945, the straight of U.S. Route 1 going through McBee was named a Blue Star Memorial Highway Number 6.

Railroad
  In the 1900s the Seaboard Air Line Railroad made McBee the starting point of the Columbia, Monroe, and Charlotte Railroad.

Arts and culture
 The Taste of McBee - mid-March
 Sandhills Classic Band Invitational - late September
 McLeod Farms Strawberry Festival - early May
 McLeod Farms Peach Festival - early July
 McLeod Farms Fall Festival - late October 
 McBee Homecoming Parade - late October
 McBee Christmas Parade - early December

Notable people
 Don King, NFL player born here
 Noah O. Knight, Medal of Honor recipient born here

See also
 Carolina Sandhills National Wildlife Refuge
 National Register of Historic Places listings in Chesterfield County, South Carolina
 McBee High School

References

External links
 Town of McBee official website
 Chesterfield County website
 Map of McBee

Towns in Chesterfield County, South Carolina
Towns in South Carolina